, rockets of the UR-500 / Proton family have accumulated 430 launches since 1965, 382 of which were successful, yielding an  success rate. 

For launches in a specific decade, see:
 List of Proton launches (1965–1969)
 List of Proton launches (1970–1979)
 List of Proton launches (1980–1989)
 List of Proton launches (1990–1999)
 List of Proton launches (2000–2009)
 List of Proton launches (2010–2019)
 List of Proton launches (2020–2029)

This chart is up to date .

Universal Rocket (rocket family)
Proton